Margaret Rumer Godden  (10 December 1907 – 8 November 1998) was an English author of more than 60 fiction and non-fiction books. Nine of her works have been made into films, most notably Black Narcissus in 1947 and The River in 1951.

A few of her works were co-written with her elder sister, novelist Jon Godden, including Two Under the Indian Sun, a memoir of the Goddens' childhood in a region of India now part of Bangladesh.

Early life

Godden was born in Eastbourne, Sussex, England. She grew up with her three sisters in Narayanganj, colonial India (now in Bangladesh), where her father, a shipping company executive, worked for the Brahmaputra Steam Navigation Company. Her parents sent the girls to England for schooling, as was the custom of the time, but brought them back to Narayanganj when the First World War began. 

Godden returned to the United Kingdom with her sisters to continue her interrupted schooling in 1920, spending time at Moira House School in Eastbourne and eventually training as a dance teacher. She went back to Calcutta in 1925 and opened a dance school for English and Indian children. Godden ran the school for 20 years with the help of her sister Nancy. During this time she published her first best-seller, the 1939 novel Black Narcissus.

Writing career

In 1942, after eight years in an unhappy marriage (one she entered into in 1934 because she was pregnant), she moved with her two daughters, Jane and Paula, (her husband Laurence Foster having joined the army) to Kashmir, living first on a houseboat and then in a rented house where she started a farm. The novel Kingfishers Catch Fire was based on her time in Kashmir. After a mysterious incident in which it appeared that an attempt had been made to poison both her and her daughters, she returned to Calcutta in 1944. She returned to the United Kingdom in 1945 to concentrate on her writing, frequently moving house but living mostly in Sussex and London. She was divorced in 1948. After returning from America to oversee the script for the movie of her book The River, Godden married civil servant James Haynes Dixon on 26November 1949.

In the early 1950s Godden became interested in the Catholic Church, though she did not officially convert until 1968, and several of her later novels contain sympathetic portrayals of Catholic priests and nuns. In addition to Black Narcissus, two of her books deal with the subject of women in religious communities. In Five for Sorrow, Ten for Joy and In This House of Brede she acutely examined the balance between the mystical, spiritual aspects of religion and the practical, human realities of religious life.

A number of Godden's novels are set in India, the atmosphere of which she evokes through all the senses; her writing is vivid with detail of smells, textures, light, flowers, noises and tactile experiences. Her books for children, especially her several doll stories, strongly convey the secret thoughts, confusions, disappointments and aspirations of childhood.  Her plots often involve unusual young people not recognised for their talents by ordinary lower- or middle-class people but supported by the educated, rich, and upper-class, to the anger, resentment, and puzzlement of their relatives. She won a 1972 Whitbread award for The Diddakoi, a young adult novel about Gypsies, televised by the BBC as Kizzy.

Later life and death
In 1968 she took the tenancy of Lamb House in Rye, East Sussex, where she lived until the death of her husband in 1973. She moved to Moniaive in Dumfriesshire in 1978, when she was 70, to be near her daughter Jane. She was appointed an Officer of the Order of the British Empire (OBE) in 1993. She visited India once more, in 1994, returning to Kashmir for the filming of a BBC Bookmark documentary about her life and books.

Rumer Godden died on 8 November 1998 at the age of 90 after a series of strokes; her ashes were buried with those of her second husband in Rye.

Works

Books for adults

Fiction
 1936 Chinese Puzzle, her first published book-length work
 1937 The Lady and the Unicorn
 1939 Black Narcissus, a story about the disorientation of British Anglican nuns in India; the first of her books to be adapted for the screen, as the film of the same name in 1947; a radio adaptation was also broadcast in 2008. A BBC mini-series was announced in September 2019 and aired in late 2020. 
 1940 Gypsy, Gypsy
 1942 Breakfast with the Nikolides
 1945 A Fugue in Time, published in the US as Take Three Tenses, made into the film Enchantment in 1948 starring David Niven and Teresa Wright
 1946 The River, made into a film in 1951 directed by Jean Renoir; she collaborated on the screenplay for the film.
 1947 A Candle for St. Jude
 1950 A Breath of Air
 1953 Kingfishers Catch Fire
 1956 An Episode of Sparrows, made into the film Innocent Sinners in 1958
 1957 Mooltiki, and other stories and poems of India
 1958 The Greengage Summer, made into a film in 1961
 1961 China Court: The Hours of a Country House
 1963 The Battle of the Villa Fiorita, filmed in 1965
 1968 Gone: A Thread of Stories (written with Jon Godden)
 1968 Swans and Turtles (short stories)
 1969 In This House of Brede, follows Philippa along with other cloistered Benedictine nuns in the abbey of Brede in Sussex, through Philippa's first years in the abbey; made into a 1975 television film  starring Diana Rigg
 1975 The Peacock Spring, adapted for television in 1995
 1979 Five For Sorrow, Ten For Joy
 1981 The Dark Horse
 1984 Thursday's Children (Viking, New York)
 1989 Indian Dust (written with Jon Godden)
 1990 Mercy, Pity, Peace, and Love: Stories (written with Jon Godden)
 1991 Coromandel Sea Change
 1994 Pippa Passes
 1997 Cromartie vs. the God Shiva, her last novel

Non-fiction
 1943 Rungli-Rungliot –  republished in 1961 as Thus Far and No Further
 1945 Bengal Journey: A story of the part played by women in the province, 1939–1945
 1955 Hans Christian Andersen (biography)
 1966 Two Under the Indian Sun (childhood memories – written with Jon Godden)
 1968 Mrs. Manders' Cook Book
 1971 The Tale of the Tales: Beatrix Potter Ballet
 1972 Shiva's Pigeons (written with Jon Godden)
 1977 The Butterfly Lions
 1980 Gulbadan: Portrait of a Rose Princess At the Mughal Court
 1987 A Time to Dance, No Time to Weep, an autobiography
 1989 A House with Four Rooms, an autobiography

Children's books
 1947 The Doll's House, made into an animated series: Tottie: The Story of a Doll's House
 1951 The Mousewife
 1952 Mouse House
 1954 Impunity Jane: The Story of a Pocket Doll
 1956 The Fairy Doll
 1958 The Story of Holly and Ivy
 1960 Candy Floss
 1961 Saint Jerome and the Lion (retelling of the legend in verse)
 1961 Miss Happiness and Miss Flower, about Japanese dolls and the house built for them.
 1963 Little Plum, the sequel to Miss Happiness and Miss Flower
 1964 Home is the Sailor
 1967 The Kitchen Madonna: two children make an icon for their Ukrainian housekeeper, a war refugee.
 1969 Operation Sippacik
 1972 The Diddakoi (also published as Gypsy Girl), a children's book and winner of the Whitbread Award. Adapted by the BBC as a radio drama of the same name starring Nisa Cole, and for television as Kizzy.
 1972 The Old Woman Who Lived in a Vinegar Bottle
 1975 Mr. McFadden's Hallowe'en
 1977 The Rocking Horse Secret
 1978 A Kindle of Kittens
 1981 The Dragon of Og
 1983 Four Dolls
 1983 The Valiant Chatti-Maker
 1984 Mouse Time: Two Stories
 1990 Fu-Dog
 1992 Great Grandfather's House
 1992 Listen to the Nightingale
 1996 The Little Chair
 1996 Premlata and the Festival of Lights

Poetry
 1949 In Noah's Ark
 1968 A Letter to the World (based on the works of Emily Dickinson)
 1996 Cockcrow to Starlight: A Day Full of Poetry (anthology for children)
 1996 A Pocket Book of Spiritual Poems

Translations
 1963 Prayers from the Ark, a translation of a collection of poems by French author Carmen Bernos de Gasztold
 1967 The Beasts' Choir, a translation of a collection of poems by French author Carmen Bernos de Gasztold

See also
 Paws and Whiskers 2014 anthology includes Godden's story about her dog Piers.

References

Further reading
Chisholm, Anne (1998), Rumer Godden: A Storyteller's  Life. New York: Greenwillow.
Joseph, Margaret Paul. Jasmine on a String: A Survey of Women in India Writing Fiction in English. OUP, 2014.

External links

 The Rumer Godden Literary Trust
 
 
 

1907 births
1998 deaths
British people in colonial India
English women novelists
English children's writers
Converts to Roman Catholicism
Officers of the Order of the British Empire
People from Dumfries and Galloway
People from Eastbourne
English Roman Catholics
Narayanganj District
Roman Catholic writers
Costa Book Award winners
20th-century English women writers
20th-century English novelists
British women children's writers